Dante's Inferno: The Private Life of Dante Gabriel Rossetti, Poet and Painter (1967) is a feature-length 35 mm film directed by Ken Russell and first screened on the BBC on 22 December 1967 as part of Omnibus. It quickly became a staple in cinemas in retrospectives of Russell's work. Using nonlinear narrative technique, it tells of the relationship between the 19th-century artist and poet Dante Gabriel Rossetti and his model, Elizabeth Siddal.

Plot
The exhumation of Lizzie Siddal's desiccated body is seen, followed by a shot of Rossetti dancing among the flames of a bonfire of paintings by Reynolds and Gainsborough. A voice-over informs us that Rossetti is a founder of a revolutionary group of artists called the Pre-Raphaelite Brotherhood. The figure of the young Lizzie dressed as Joan of Arc appears above the flames. Lizzie is seen modelling for Millais' Ophelia and for a painting of Joan by Rossetti. The voice-over states that she eats little and often throws it up. She and Rossetti spend several years together while he paints and draws her but she spurns his sexual advances, even slashing him with a needle when he presses himself on her. Rossetti turns to the more accommodating Fanny Cornforth.

Lizzie is introduced to laudanum by Emma Brown to alleviate her stomach pain. She is advised by Christina Rossetti that Dante Gabriel needs a patron. Christina's voice-over speaks her poem In an Artist's Studio, about Lizzie. She tells Lizzie she looks ill. Rossetti and Christina visit William Holman Hunt, who is painting The Light of the World. Hunt asks Rossetti to look after his girlfriend Annie Miller while he is away in the Holy Land painting The Scapegoat but Rossetti has an affair with her and Hunt spurns her on his return. John Ruskin visits Rossetti's studio and shows an interest in Lizzie's art.

Rossetti meets Edward Burne-Jones and William Morris in Oxford and encounters the beautiful Jane Burden. They paint the Oxford Union murals. Jane marries Morris and Rossetti marries Lizzie. Lizzie becomes increasingly hysterical due to her laudanum use and Rossetti's philandering. She dies from an overdose. Rossetti buries his unpublished poems with her. Some years later, Charles Augustus Howell persuades him to dig the poems up but Rossetti is haunted by the image of the dead Lizzie and becomes addicted to chloral. Fanny Cornforth rescues him from a suicide attempt but Rossetti is now increasingly obsessed with Morris' wife Jane. He sleeps with her when Morris is away in Iceland but she remains distant. Isolated, with only the loyal Fanny to care for him, Rossetti sinks further into addiction.

Cast
 Oliver Reed as Dante Gabriel Rossetti
 Judith Paris as Elizabeth Siddal
 Andrew Faulds as William Morris
 Iza Teller as Christina Rossetti
 Christopher Logue as Algernon Swinburne
 Gala Mitchell as Jane Morris
 Pat Ashton as Fanny Cornforth
 Clive Goodwin as John Ruskin
 David Jones as Charles Augustus Howell
 Norman Dewhurst as Edward Burne-Jones
 Tony Gray as William Michael Rossetti
 Douglas Gray as William Holman Hunt
 Derek Boshier as John Everett Millais
 Caroline Coon as Annie Miller
 Janet Deuters as Emma Brown
 Austin Frazer, the narrator.

Inception
Russell had made an earlier film for television about the Pre-Raphaelites called Old Battersea House (1961), the success of which had drawn attention to the then-unfashionable art. Russell's original intention was to make a film showing the lives and works of the three main Pre-Raphaelite painters – Rossetti, Millais and Holman Hunt — but the arrival of a script into Russell's office at the BBC by Austin Frazer, solely about Rossetti, prompted Russell's change of plan. He thought that a story about a man who exhumes his dead wife and then is haunted by the deed was highly dramatic and marketable. Russell cast many of his friends and used amateur actors, including the pop artist Derek Boshier as Millais and the poet Christopher Logue as Swinburne." Much of the location shooting was done in the Lake District.

Reception
Dante's Infernos visual style is taken mostly from the Pre-Raphaelite paintings themselves, many of which, such as Millais' Ophelia are filmed in the actual locations where the paintings were created. Russell also uses imagery inspired by silent comedy and expressionist horror films.

Dante's Inferno has been described as "bit of a mess" despite moments of "inspired lunacy". Russell's biographer Joseph Lanza takes the view that its moody black-and-white photography makes the locations in the English Lake District seem like Dracula's Transylvania. Joseph A. Gomez argues that its chaotic appearance hides a sophisticated structure,

Notes

1967 television films
1967 films
British biographical films
Biographical films about painters
Biographical films about poets
British television films
Films directed by Ken Russell
Pre-Raphaelite Brotherhood in popular culture
Cultural depictions of 19th-century painters
Cultural depictions of British men
1960s English-language films
1960s British films